Padma Khanna is an Indian actress, dancer and director. She appeared mainly in Hindi and Bhojpuri films in the 1970s and 1980s. She is most remembered for her role in the film Saudagar with Amitabh Bachchan and also as Queen Kaikeyi in Ramanand Sagar's epic series Ramayan (1987–1988). She has acted in two Telugu films with N. T. Rama Rao Desoddarakulu and Rajaputra Rahasyam.

Early life

Khanna started her Kathak training when she was about 7, from Pandit Birju Maharaj. She was born in Banares and was introduced to Bollywood under the suggestions of actresses Padmini and Vyjayanthimala.

Career
Khanna debuted as an actress in the 1962 Bhojpuri film Ganga Maiyya Tohe Piyari Chadhaibo. She got her break in 1970 when she played a cabaret dancer in Johnny Mera Naam. She often played dancers, appearing in films like Loafer, Jaan-e-Bahaar and Pakeezah in which she acted as a double for Meena Kumari in the opening sequence and the songs Chalo Dildaar Chalo and Teer-E-Nazar Dekhenge. In the 1980s, she played Queen Kaikeyi in Ramanand Sagar's Ramayan which aired on Doordarshan.

In 2008, she choreographed and acted in a musical based on the epic Ramayana with 64 actors and dancers at Avery Fisher Hall, New York City, directed by her husband, Jagdish L. Sidana. She also directed a Bhojpuri film, Nahir Hutal Jaya (2004).

Personal life
She was married to the late film director Jagdish L. Sidana. The couple moved to the state of New Jersey in United States in the 1990s where they opened a kathak academy. Khanna's adult children help her to run the academy.

Filmography
Television
Pehchaan (2006) on Hum TV
Taank Jhaank on Sony TV
Ramayan on Doordarshan as Kaikeyi
Metha Zaher on Doordarshan

Hindi films

Biwi Aur Makaan (1966)
Yeh Zindagi Kitni Haseen Hai (1966) 
Baharon Ke Sapne (1967)
Chand Par Chadayee (1967)
Heer Raanjha (1970)
Johny Mera Naam (1970)
Seema (1971)
Dastaan (1972 film) (1972)
Pyar Diwana (1972)
Rampur Ka Lakshman (1972)
Pakeezah (1972) (body double of Meena Kumari)
Saudagar (1973)
Daag (1973 film)
Joshila (1973)
Anhonee (1973)
Naina (1973)
Anokhi Ada (1973)
Aaj Ki Taaza Khabar (1973)
Loafer (1973)
Kashmakash (1973)
Hera Pheri (1976)
Paapi (1977)
Lakhan (1979)
Jaan-e-Bahaar (1979)
Noorie (1979)
Banmanush (1980)
Dhuan (1981)
Anubhav (1986)
Ghar Sansar (1986)
Ghar Ghar Ki Kahani (1988)
Farz Ki Jung (1989)
Yaar Meri Zindagi (2008)

Bhojpuri films

Ganga Maiyya Tohe Piyari Chadhaibo (1963)
Bidesiya (1963)
Balam Pardesia (1979)
Basuria Baje Ganga Teer (1986)
Dharti Maiya
Mai (1989)
Dagabaj Balma
Bahuria
Godna
Tulsi Sorhe Hamar Angna
Kajari
Rangali Chunaria Rang Me Tohar
Bhauji De Da Aacharawa Ke Chao
Bhaiya Dooj
Hey Tulsi Maiya

Gujarati Films

Gher Gher Maati na chula (1977)

Punjabi films
 Jindri Yaar Di (1978)
 Sher Puttar (1978)

Marathi film
Devta (1983 film) Cameo in song "Khel Kunala Daivacha Kalala"
 Maaficha Sakshidar (1986) - Cameo in song "Shama Ne Jab Aag"

References

External links
 
 Padma Khanna, Filmography at Bollywood Hungama

Indian film actresses
Living people
Actresses in Hindi cinema
Actresses in Bhojpuri cinema
Indian television actresses
Actresses in Punjabi cinema
Place of birth missing (living people)
Indian child actresses
Punjabi people
Year of birth missing (living people)